The Ping Island is a river island with a general perimeter of about  and an area of  in the middle north of Lingling District, Yongzhou, Hunan. Ping Island is one of the main attractions in Yongzhou. Ping Island is located at the confluence of the east branch and west branch (from Guangxi) of the (Xiao River), and the main course of the Xiang River.

References

Geography of Yongzhou
Islands of Hunan
River islands of China